Sherman is a village in Sangamon County, Illinois, United States. The population was 4,148 at the 2010 census. It is part of the Springfield, Illinois Metropolitan Statistical Area.

Geography

Demographics

As of the census of 2000, there were 2,871 people, 962 households, and 771 families residing in the village. The racial makeup of the village was 97.74% White, 0.31% African American, 0.42% Native American, 1.01% Asian, 0.07% Pacific Islander, 0.03% from other races, and 0.42% from two or more races. Hispanic or Latino of any race were 0.52% of the population.

White alone - 3,161 (96.3%)
Two or more races - 51 (1.6%)
Asian alone - 40 (1.2%)
American alone - 22 (0.7%)
Hispanic - 8 (0.2%)

There were 962 households, out of which 41.8% had children under the age of 18 living with them, 70.6% were married couples living together, 7.0% had a female householder with no husband present, and 19.8% were non-families. 16.2% of all households were made up of individuals, and 7.1% had someone living alone who was 65 years of age or older. An estimated 1.2% of households are same-sex couples. The average household size was 2.78 and the average family size was 3.13.

In the village, the population was spread out, with 26.6% under the age of 18, 5.6% from 18 to 24, 27.5% from 25 to 44, 25.2% from 45 to 64, and 15.1% who were 65 years of age or older. The median age was 39 years. For every 100 females, there were 90.9 males. For every 100 females age 18 and over, there were 86.3 males.

As of 2016, the median income for a household in the village was $94,695. Males had a median income of $59,582 versus $47,421 for females. The median property value for the village was $217,200. None of the families and 1.47% of the population were living below the poverty line.

Education

Sherman is part of the Williamsville-Sherman Community Unit School District #15.  Williamsville CUSD #15 was one of five area schools awarded the Bright Star Award for educational excellence at the elementary and high school level.

Places of Interest
The Rail Golf Course, an 18-hole golf course and home of the LPGA State Farm Rail Classic from 1976 to 2006.

Route 66 Crossing, a retail and commercial district located on Sherman's north side.

Restaurants in the area include Sam's Too Pizza. Sam's is an Italian restaurant founded in 1995 that has been a staple in the Sherman area since opening.

Sherman Village Park, a 10-acre park located on Sherman's south side.  The park includes an amphitheatre, pavilions, a pond, and a 1-mile walking/cycling trail.

Sherman-Williamsville Trail, a planned 4.4 mile rail trail linking Sherman and Williamsville.

References

Villages in Sangamon County, Illinois
Villages in Illinois
Springfield metropolitan area, Illinois